Iron lung is the colloquial name for a negative pressure ventilator.

Iron Lung may also refer to:

 Iron Lung (band), a punk band from Seattle
 Iron Lung (EP), a 1993 EP by Pram
 My Iron Lung, a 1994 album, by British alternative rock band Radiohead
 "My Iron Lung", a song from the album
 "Iron Lung", a song by King Gizzard and the Lizard Wizard from the 2022 album Ice, Death, Planets, Lungs, Mushrooms and Lava 
 Iron Lung (video game), a 2022 indie science fiction horror video game